Hang Tau Tsuen is a village in the Ping Shan area of Yuen Long District, in Hong Kong. It is part of the Ping Shan Heritage Trail.

Administration
Hang Tau Tsuen is a recognized village under the New Territories Small House Policy.

History
Hang Tau Tsuen is one of the three wais (walled villages) and six tsuens (villages) established by the Tang Clan of Ping Shan, namely: Sheung Cheung Wai, Kiu Tau Wai, Fui Sha Wai, Hang Tau Tsuen, Hang Mei Tsuen, Tong Fong Tsuen, San Tsuen, Hung Uk Tsuen and San Hei Tsuen.

At the time of the 1911 census, the population of Hang Tau was 394. The number of males was 171.

References

External links

 Delineation of area of existing village Hang Tau Tsuen (Ping Shan) for election of resident representative (2019 to 2022)
 Antiquities and Monuments Office. Hong Kong Traditional Chinese Architectural Information System. Hang Tau Tsuen
 Antiquities Advisory Board. Historic Building Appraisal. Yeung Hau Temple, Sheung Cheung Wai, Ping Shan Pictures
 Antiquities and Monuments Office. Yan Tun Kong Study Hall
 Antiquities Advisory Board. Historic Building Appraisal. Nos. 89 and 124 Hang Tau Tsuen, Ping Shan Pictures
 Antiquities Advisory Board. Historic Building Appraisal. No. 99 Hang Tau Tsuen, Ping Shan Pictures
 Antiquities Advisory Board. Historic Building Appraisal. No. 55 Hang Tau Tsuen, Ping Shan Pictures
 Antiquities Advisory Board. Historic Building Appraisal. Ng Kwai Tong, No. 1 Hang Tau Tsuen, Ping Shan Pictures

Villages in Yuen Long District, Hong Kong
Ping Shan